Ali Salem al-Beidh (born 10 February 1939) is a Yemeni politician who served as the General Secretary of the Yemeni Socialist Party (YSP) in South Yemen and as Vice President of Yemen following the unification in 1990. He left the unification government in 1993, sparking the 1994 civil war in Yemen and then went into exile in Oman. He is a leader of the Southern independence movement known as Al Hirak.

Leadership in South Yemen
He studied for a Commerce degree and became a School Teacher in Mukalla in 1961. He joined the National Liberation Front in 1963 as the Local Committee founder in Mukalla, and went underground in 1965. In 1966 he was admitted into the Hadramawt Provincial Committee of the NLF. After independence he joined the YSP. In 1971 he was selected as the General Secretary of the Hadhramawt Provincial Committee and was admitted into the YSP National Central Committee as a Candidate-Member. Selected as Full Member of the Central Committee in 1975, well as Deputy Minister for School Education and Vocational Training. In 1977, he was admitted as Candidate Member for the YSP Politburo, and a full Politburo member in 1981. Ali took the top position in the YSP following a 12-day 1986 civil war between forces loyal to former chairman Abdul Fattah Ismail and then-chairman Ali Nasir Muhammad. An Ismail ally, he took control after Muhammad's defeat and defection and Ismail's disappearance. In a coup that took the lives of anywhere from 4,000 to 10,000 people, Ali was one of the few high-ranking officials who survived.

Suffering a loss of more than half its aid from the Soviet Union from 1986 to 1989 and an interest in possible oil reserves on the border between the countries, Ali's government worked toward unification with North Yemen officials.

Unification and Civil War
Following the unification of South Yemen with the Yemen Arab Republic in 1990, he took up the position of vice-president in the transition government of unified Yemen. But in 1993, Ali quit the government and returned to the former Southern capital of Aden, claiming that the new government was systematically marginalizing the southern people ignoring the needs of the south. On 21 May 1994, as the South's military position weakened, Ali declared the Democratic Republic of Yemen. He served as the only President of the DRY, from 21 May to 7 July 1994. Ali fled to the neighboring Sultanate of Oman after the secession failed.

South Yemen movement
After fifteen years of living in exile Ali Salim al-Beidh resumed his political career on the eve of the 19th anniversary of the Yemeni unification. This came amid highly escalating tensions in the south, with clashes and violence between protesters and Yemeni security forces. In a televised speech from Kitzbühel, Austria, the former President called for a return of South Yemen. Since then he has called for several demonstrations to demonstrate the strength of the movement. These have continued into 2011. As a result of his increased involvement, he lost his right to stay in Oman after violating the conditions of his citizenship. Following the 2011 Yemeni uprising, he renewed calls for reinstating South Yemen as a separate country.

See also 
South Yemen insurgency
2009 speech

References

1939 births
Living people
Yemeni Socialist Party politicians
Vice presidents of Yemen